The Nikon F100 is a 35 mm film-based single-lens reflex camera body introduced in 1999. It is often thought of as a scaled-down version of the Nikon F5, and as a precursor to the Nikon F6. The F100 was discontinued, along with most other Nikon film cameras, in 2006.

Design and construction 
The F100's metering system is a development of Nikon's matrix metering technology introduced in 1983 on the Nikon FA. The meter in the F100 uses a 10 segment light sensor and uses distance information from Nikon D-type and G-type lenses for more accurate exposure calculations when using direct flash. In addition to matrix metering, the F100 also offers standard center-weighted and spot metering modes.

Also incorporated into the camera is Nikon's Dynamic Autofocus system and a 4.5 frame per second motor drive with automatic rewind. The top motor drive speed can be boosted to 5 frames per second with the addition of the Nikon MB-15 battery pack.

The F100 also provides many features which are common among high-end 35 mm SLR cameras, such as automatic bracketing modes, DX film speed sensing, and custom functions that allow photographers to tailor certain aspects of the camera's operation to the way they work.

During its production run, Nikon replaced the film rewind spool for these cameras due to a manufacturing defect.

References

External links 

 Nikon F100 Review by Thom Hogan
 Nikon F100 user enthusiast website (archive.org mirror)

F100
F100